Biləcəri (also, Baku, Baladjary, Biläcäri, Baladžary, and Baladzhary) is a settlement and municipality in Baku, Azerbaijan.  It has a population of 45,008.  The municipality consists of the settlements of Biləcəri and Sulutəpə.

Notable natives 
Musa Naghiyev

References 

Populated places in Baku